Pebblebrook High School is a high school in the Cobb County School District in Mableton, Georgia, United States. The school opened in 1963, serving grades 9-12. Pebblebrook houses the Cobb County Center for Excellence in the Performing Arts, the first magnet program offered within the Cobb County School District.

History

Pebblebrook has had two campuses in its history. The first was at the (formerly) Lindley Middle School building on Pebblebrook Circle, and its current location.

Feeder schools
Elementary schools:
Bryant Intermediate 
Clay Harmony Leland Elementary
Riverside Elementary
City View Elementary
 
Middle schools:
Lindley Middle
Garrett Middle

Cobb County Center for Excellence in the Performing Arts
The Cobb County Center for Excellence in the Performing Arts (CCCEPA) is a coeducational public magnet program housed on the campus of Pebblebrook High School. CCCEPA offers rigorous training in five major performing arts fields, vocal music, drama, dance, technical theatre, and musical theatre. Interested students are offered one of four auditions throughout the school year.

Sports

Baseball
Boys' basketball
Girls' basketball
Cheerleading
Cross country
Drill team
Football
Boys' golf
Girls' golf
Raider Team
Boys' soccer
Girls' soccer
Fastpitch softball
Boys' tennis
Girls' tennis
Boys' track
Girls' track
Volleyball
Wrestling
Lacrosse

Notable alumni

 , former Georgia Insurance Commissioner

References

External links
 

Schools in Cobb County, Georgia
Public high schools in Georgia (U.S. state)
1963 establishments in Georgia (U.S. state)
Educational institutions established in 1963